This is a list of Number 1 hit singles in 1962 in New Zealand from the Lever Hit Parade.

Chart

References

 Number One Singles Of 1962

1962 in New Zealand
1962 record charts
1962
1960s in New Zealand music